Hyllisia vicina is a species of beetle in the family Cerambycidae. It was described by Breuning in 1982.

References

vicina
Beetles described in 1982